Lloyd Hotel is a hotel housed in a historic building in the Eastern Docklands of Amsterdam, commissioned by the Royal Holland Lloyd (Koninklijke Hollandsche Lloyd). Founded as a hotel, it initially housed travelling immigrants. Later, it was used as a detention centre and was also home to artists' studios. It is an official national monument of the Netherlands.

History

The building was established in 1918 in the eclectic style,  designed by architect Evert Breman, commissioned by the Royal Holland Lloyd (KHL). The KHL did use the hotel as advertising, to recruit clients for passengers heading to South America.  When it was completed on June 1, 1921, it had cost eight times more than originally estimated, contributing to the subsequent bankruptcy of the KHL.

From 1921 to 1936 the building was used as temporary accommodation for immigrants, mostly poor Eastern European Jews. In 1936, the KHL went bankrupt and the building was purchased by the City of Amsterdam. Subsequently, from 1938 it was used as a shelter for Jewish refugees from Germany and during World War II, the building was used as detention centre. After the war it continued to function as an adult prison, and later became a juvenile detention centre in 1963.

By 1989 the detention center building had fallen into neglect. It was then served as studio space for artists from the former Yugoslavia. In 1996, a competition was held to decide what the building would best be used for. The curator Suzanne Oxenaar and art historian Otto Nan presented a design for a hotel and "cultural embassy" of culture in Amsterdam. Their plan was developed in sketches by the architect firm MVRDV and after an extensive restoration, the building has served as a hotel since 2004, placed on the monument list in 2001. The hotel has 117 rooms.

Design
Over 40 Dutch and international designers worked on the interior of Lloyd Hotel.

References

External links
Official site

Hotels in Amsterdam
Prisons in the Netherlands
Hotel buildings completed in 1921
Rijksmonuments in Amsterdam
Amsterdam-Oost
1921 establishments in the Netherlands
20th-century architecture in the Netherlands